Leonard Tay (born 25 November 1912, date of death unknown) was a Chinese sprinter. He competed in the men's 400 metres at the 1936 Summer Olympics.

References

External links

1912 births
Year of death missing
Athletes (track and field) at the 1936 Summer Olympics
Chinese male sprinters
Olympic athletes of China
Place of birth missing